Yang Xiuli (born September 1, 1983 in Fuxin, Liaoning) is a Chinese judoka. She won a gold medal at the 2008 Olympics and a bronze medal at the 2006 Asian Games 78 kg category.

References

External links
 
 

1983 births
Living people
Judoka at the 2008 Summer Olympics
Judoka at the 2012 Summer Olympics
Olympic gold medalists for China
Olympic judoka of China
People from Fuxin
Place of birth missing (living people)
Olympic medalists in judo
Asian Games medalists in judo
Sportspeople from Liaoning
Medalists at the 2008 Summer Olympics
Judoka at the 2006 Asian Games
Judoka at the 2010 Asian Games
Chinese female judoka
Asian Games bronze medalists for China
Medalists at the 2006 Asian Games
Medalists at the 2010 Asian Games
21st-century Chinese women